Sideroxylon polynesicum, the keahi or island nesoluma, is a species of flowering plant in the family Sapotaceae. It is found in the Cook (New Zealand), Tubuai (French Polynesia), and Hawaiian Islands (United States). It is threatened by habitat loss.

Taxonomy
This species was first described as Chrysophyllum polynesicum by William Hillebrand in 1888, two years after his demise. Then Henri Ernest Baillon transferred it to the genus Nesoluma, all of  whose constituent species were later incorporated into the genus Sideroxylon as a result of phylogenetic analyses.

References

polynesicum
Flora of the Cook Islands
Flora of Hawaii
Flora of the Tubuai Islands
Taxonomy articles created by Polbot
Taxobox binomials not recognized by IUCN